Lucerne Lake is a dry lake bed  in the Mojave Desert of San Bernardino County, California,  east of Apple Valley.

See also
List of lakes in California

References
 

Endorheic lakes of California
Lakes of the Mojave Desert
Lakes of San Bernardino County, California
Lakes of California
Lakes of Southern California